is a Japanese manga series written and illustrated by Sayori Ochiai. It was serialized in Shueisha's seinen manga magazine Ultra Jump from June 2009 to October 2022, with its chapters collected in 18 tankōbon volumes. It follows Makoto Saeki, the daughter of a shrine priest who can see the shrine's messenger, Gintarou, and the everyday lives of the two as a go-between for the gods and humans. A twelve-episode anime television series adaptation by Diomedéa was broadcast from October to December 2013.

Plot
Makoto Saeki is the daughter of a shrine priest in a small Inari Shinto shrine dedicated to the God Ukanomitama. When she was 4 years old, her mother died and she inherited an unusual gift called The Sight, allowing her to see the Shrine's Heralds. She met the messenger of the god Inari, an anthropomorphic fox named Gintarou, during the funeral, and he declared her as the fifteenth generation heiress. Gintarou can see a short glimpse into the future and can find lost things despite being rude and unmotivated, but still develops a good friendship with Makoto. As she is the only girl who can see the spirit, both of them decide to be a go-between for the gods and humans as they try to help those who come to the shrine.

Characters

Saeki Shrine

 
A true successor of the Saeki Inari Shrine. When her mother died before Makoto turned 4 years old, she gained the ability to see heralds, who serve as messengers of the gods. Makoto lives with her father Tatsuo and Gintarou until Satoru and Haru arrive to live with them as well. She is also known in her school for telling accurate fortunes albeit through Gintarou's help.

 
The herald of Saeki Shrine, he appears as a huge white fox that protected the shrine for 15 generations of successors of the Saeki family. Although seemingly laid-back and uninterested in human affairs, Gintarou actually cares a lot for Makoto despite his claims that she is annoying. He has a penchant for oranges due to his past where he was saved by a young lady.

 
Makoto's father and also the Saeki Shrine's priest. He does not possess the sight to see Gintarou, unlike his daughter and deceased wife as he was married into the family. However, he knows about Gintarou and hopes to be able to see him. He was born Tatsuo Toyokura, but adopted his wife's surname when he chose to become a priest instead of a brewer.

 
The successor to the Kamio Shrine, he inherited the sight from his grandfather after his death since Satoru's parents died earlier due to an accident.. He was raised by some relatives who mistreated him and he was isolated from the others. He later moved away to stay at Saeki Shrine with Haru. He is popular with the girls in school and also proficient in Kendo. In the manga, he is shown to slowly take a liking to Makoto and has a rivalry with Nanami Kosugi.

 
An 80-year-old fox herald of Kamio Shrine. She was once a young fox who had been killed by a vehicle and her spirit followed Satoru's great-grandfather to Kamio Shrine and became a herald. She is very attached to Satoru and is jealous of any girl who approaches him.

Shinto West Public High School

 
Makoto's classmate who once seek help from her to resolve her relationship problem with Shōhei. She is laid-back but stubborn and also at odds with Hiwako's personality, but eventually she becomes close friends with Hiwako and Makoto after being invited by Makoto to stay at her shrine. She is interested to work in any jobs with animals.

 
Makoto's classmate and also the vice-president of the student council. She is a model student who comes from a wealthy family which specialises in tea ceremonies. She used to be cold to others due to her strict upbringing but she changes after becoming close friends with Makoto and Yumi. She also seems to have a crush on Makoto's father.

 
The blond-hair 3rd-year student council president. He looks like a foreigner as his grandmother was a British. He has also known Taisuke since they were in the same elementary school. He is obsessed over Hiwako.

 
Captain of the Kendo Club with a big stature. He is bad at making tofu although his family owns a tofu shop. He recognises Satoru's efforts that he places on Kendo that he manages to stop him from quitting the Kendo Club.

 
Member of the Kendo Club. He despises Satoru over his poor attitude. He also seems to have developed a crush on Makoto.

 
Makoto's classmate whose family owns an inn. She loves to eat and intends to be a chef or nutritionist.

 
Makoto's classmate. She is working part-time to save money to go into nursing.

Heralds

 
Another fox herald and Gintarou's partner who left to parts unknown centuries before.
  
  (Saimaru) and Yōji Ueda (Utamaru)
Two old lion-dog heralds who live at a Matsunō altar behind the Shoubai Grand Shrine. Saimaru is 1500-years old and Utamaru is 1400-years old.

 
A 300-year-old turtle herald whose shrine was destroyed and found a new home with Saimaru and Utamaru thanks to Makoto and Gintarou.
  
  (Fu) and Kotori Koiwai (Fuku)
Two 60-year-old young monkey heralds from an abandoned shrine inside Amabuki Temple who like to play pranks on humans.

The other fox herald of Kamio Shrine.

The rabbit herald of Sumiyoshi Shrine.

The other rabbit herald of Sumiyoshi Shrine.

The other rabbit herald of Sumiyoshi Shrine.

The crow herald of Kumano Shrine.

A wolf herald who does not live in a specific shrine and travels to various shrines with his human friend Touko.

The rooster herald of Kota Jingu Shrine.

The other rooster herald of Kota Jingu Shrine.

Other characters

 
Yumi's boyfriend and studies at a different school. He lives in Amabuki Temple and his father is the head priest of the temple.

 
He is the assistant of Hiwako's father who takes charge in driving Hiwako to and from school. He is 10 years older than Hiwako and appears to have a crush on her.

 
 Tatsuo's childhood friend and a retired priest. He currently owns an Izakaya. He helps out Tatsuo with the shrine's Purification Ceremony every year.

 
 Makoto's aunt and Tatsuo's older sister. Her family owns the local Toyokura brewery. She helps out Tatsuo with the shrine's Purification Ceremony every year.

 A beautiful and friendly 28-year-old woman. She is a former editor and a novelist. Like Makoto and Satoru she has the sight but she is an orphan. She was once cornered to the point of thinking of suicide but was saved by Tetsuro, a stray wolf spirit she met by chance. She has been taking care of him ever since.

Media

Manga
It started as a full-fledged series in the same magazine on May 19, 2009. The manga was on hiatus several times. The series finished after a 14-year run on October 19, 2022. Shueisha collected its chapters in eighteen tankōbon volumes, released from September 18, 2009. to October 19, 2022.

Volume list

Light novel

Audio drama
An audio drama of the manga is released in collaboration with Shueisha and Pony Canyon in 2010 under the VOMIC label. The voices of the drama includes Kanae Itō as Makoto and Toshihiko Seki as Gintarou.

Anime
An anime television series adaptation was announced in April 2013. Diomedéa animated the series with Shin Misawa serving as the director, Hiroshi Yamaguchi as the series writer and both Mayuko Matsumoto and Naomi Ide as the character designers. Tatsuya Katou composed the music. The series was broadcast on TV Tokyo from October 7 to December 23, 2013. It also aired on the TV Osaka, TV Aichi, and AT-X stations. The opening theme song "tiny lamp" is performed by Fhána and the ending theme song  is sung by Screen Mode.

Crunchyroll also announced that they would stream the series under the name Gingitsune: Messenger Fox of the Gods. The anime has been licensed by Sentai Filmworks.

Episode list

Reception
Stig Høgset from THEM Anime Reviews praised the series' character designs for being "well-designed and well-animated" and for tackling serious topics outside of its lackadaisical tone, despite the conflicts being "overreactions made for dramatic purposes rather than realistic drama." He concluded by putting it alongside Natsume's Book of Friends as a good companion piece, calling it "relatively light and enjoyable entertainment with enough substance to not just be empty calories, and an appropriately sweet ending episode that leaves a possibility and a desire for more." Rebecca Silverman of Anime News Network reviewed the complete anime series in 2015. While finding criticism in the awkward character animations, misplaced musical score in places and lack of cultural notes about shrines, Silverman praised the series for its charming and believable characters, elegant backgrounds with distinctive shrine designs and for being informative on Shintoism, concluding that "Gingitsune is a charming gem of a show. It isn't action-packed or even particularly continuous in terms of plot, but it is warm and cozy and worth a visit to the Saeki Shrine."

Notes

References

External links

  
  
  
  
 

Animated television series about foxes
Comedy anime and manga
Diomedéa
Seinen manga
Sentai Filmworks
Shinto in fiction
Shinto kami in anime and manga
Shueisha franchises
Shueisha manga
Slice of life anime and manga
Supernatural anime and manga
TV Tokyo original programming
Yōkai in anime and manga